Alun Evans (born 1949) is an English former footballer.

Alun Evans may also refer to:
 Alun Evans (cricketer) (born 1975), Welsh cricketer
 Alun Evans (FAW) (1942–2011), Football Association of Wales Secretary General
 Alun Evans (New Zealand footballer) (born 1965), New Zealand footballer
 Alun Evans (priest) (born 1947), Welsh Anglican priest
 Alun Tan Lan, singer-songwriter (born Alun Evans)

See also
 Allan Evans (disambiguation)